Back to the Future Part III (or Back to the Future III) is a video game based on the film of the same name. The game is different from LJN's Back to the Future Part II & III video game released for the NES. The game was released in 1991 for the Genesis, Amiga, Amstrad CPC, Atari ST, Commodore 64, MS-DOS, Master System, and the ZX Spectrum. Each version of the game is more or less identical and all are loosely based on the popular film of the same name. The game was developed by Probe Software and published by Image Works and Arena Entertainment (for Sega).

Gameplay
The main game features four different levels (there are some differences between versions).

Rescue Clara
Players control Doc Brown on a horse as he races to save Clara Clayton from running off into a ravine. Players must duck and jump over obstacles while using a pistol to shoot enemies and other obstacles. In the DOS version, there are also top down segments where Doc can collect a shotgun to fire in multiple directions.
Target Shoot
Players control Marty as he shoots targets in a target range. A bonus round can be obtained by shooting multi-colored ducks.
Marty vs. Buford's Men
Players control Marty as he uses pie dishes to fight off against Buford's men, and eventually Buford himself.
The Train
Players control Marty as he makes away across the train, collecting speed logs necessary to get the train up to  while fending off enemies and avoiding obstacles such as hooks or puffs of smoke.

Reception

The game was reviewed in 1992 in Dragon #180 by Hartley, Patricia, and Kirk Lesser in "The Role of Computers" column. The reviewers gave the game 2 out of 5 stars.

The Spectrum version received a Crash Smash award, and got to number 2 in the sales charts in July 1991, behind Teenage Mutant Ninja Turtles, from the same publisher.

References

External links 
 
 
 
 Back to the Future III at CPC Zone
 Back to the Future III at Atari Legend

1991 video games
Action video games
Amiga games
Amstrad CPC games
Atari ST games
Back to the Future (franchise) video games
Commodore 64 games
DOS games
Science fiction video games
Sega Genesis games
Master System games
Single-player video games
Video games set in the 19th century
Western (genre) video games
ZX Spectrum games
Fiction set in 1885
Video games set in California
Video games scored by Barry Leitch
Video games scored by Charles Deenen
Video games developed in the United Kingdom
Image Works games